The 1976–77 Eredivisie was the 16th season of the highest-level basketball league in the Netherlands, and the 31st season of the top flight Dutch basketball competition.

BV Amstelveen won its second league title in a row.

Regular season

Individual awards 

 Most Valuable Player: Jimmy Moore (Arke Stars Enschede)
 Coach of the Year: Bill Sheridan (EBBC Den Bosch)
 Rookie of the Year: Jos Wolfs (Buitoni Haarlem)
 First-team All-Eredivisie:
 Bill Mallory (Markt Utrecht)
 Joe Wallace (BV Amstelveen)
 Jimmy Moore (Arke Stars Enschede)
 Jimmy Woudstra (Punch Delft)
 Harry Rogers (Punch Delft)
 All-Defensive Team:
 Jimmy Woudstra (Punch Delft)
 Vic Bartolome (Leiden)
 Steven Bravard (Den Bosch)
 Jimmy Moore (Arke Stars Enschede)
 Pete Miller (Donar)

References 

1977-78
1976–77 in European basketball leagues